Love in the City is a 1953 Italian anthology film composed of six segments, each with its own director. The segments and filmmakers are: Paid Love (Carlo Lizzani), Attempted Suicide (Michelangelo Antonioni), Paradise for Three Hours (Dino Risi), Marriage Agency (Federico Fellini), Story of Caterina (Francesco Maselli and Cesare Zavattini), and Italians Stare (Alberto Lattuada).

Synopsis
Paid Love
Filmed by Carlo Lizzani, seven Roman prostitutes of different age, some of them single mothers, tell their "stories of abandonment and deceit".

Attempted Suicide
Five young women, who have tried to commit suicide after being left by their partner, tell and re-enact their stories in front of Michelangelo Antonioni's camera.

Paradise for Three Hours
Dino Risi depicts the various encounters at a dance hall event which takes place every Sunday evening between 5 and 8.

Marriage Agency
Federico Fellini tells the story of a journalist doing research on marriage agencies, pretending to be looking for a wife for a rich friend who suffers from lycanthropy. To his surprise, he is presented with a prospect only a few days later.

Story of Caterina
Francesco Maselli and Cesare Zavattini follow Caterina, a young single mother ostracised by her parents, who is put on trial for abandoning her child which she can't feed.

Italians Stare
A sequence of men reacting to the passage of pretty women, filmed by Alberto Lattuada.

Cast

Attempted Suicide
 Rita Josa
 Rosanna Carta
 Enrico Pelliccia 
 Donatella Marrosu 
 Paolo Pacetti 
 Nella Bertuccioni
 Lilia Nardi 
 Lena Rossi 
 Maria Nobili

Paradise for Three Hours
 Luisella Boni

Marriage Agency
 Antonio Cifariello 
 Livia Venturini
 Maresa Gallo 
 Angela Pierro 
 Rita Andreana 
 Lia Natali
 Ilario Malaschini
 Cristina Grado
 Sue Ellen Blake
 Silvio Lillo

Story of Caterina
 Caterina Rigoglioso

Italians Stare
 Marisa Valenti
 Marco Ferreri
 Mario Bonotti
 Mara Berni
 Valeria Moriconi
 Giovanna Ralli
 Patrizia Lari
 Ugo Tognazzi
 Raimondo Vianello
 Edda Evangelisti
 Liliana Poggiali
 Maria Pia Trepaoli

Production and release
Cesare Zavattini, Marco Ferreri and Riccardo Ghione intended Love in the City as the first issue in a series of a new journal published on celluloid, of which only this one was realised. The project was a critical and commercial failure on its first release, with French critic André Bazin being one of the few commentators to write a favorable review, appreciating the concept and the interviewed nonactors. Other critics questioned the film's authenticity, arguing that the people in front of the camera were obviously following directors' instructions, or attacked it for having the mother of the Story of Caterina segment re-enact the abandoning of her child. Initial export copies were missing Carlo Lizzani's segment on prostitution due to censorship issues.

Zavattini noted in retrospect that the film lacked a central idea and common perspective on the theme, partially owed to the fact that the filmmakers had only sporadic contact during production. The result was a film partly made in a documentary style, partly as a replication of reality, and, in the case of Federico Fellini, staged with professional actors. Michelangelo Antonioni, director of the second episode, later stated that he only participated in the film as a favour to one of its makers, and commented negatively on what he saw as insincerity on the side of his interviewees.

In 2014, Love in the City was released on Blu-ray by Raro Video.

References

External links
 
 

Films directed by Federico Fellini
Films directed by Dino Risi
Films directed by Alberto Lattuada
Films directed by Francesco Maselli
1950s Italian-language films
1953 films
Films with screenplays by Federico Fellini
Films with screenplays by Cesare Zavattini
Films scored by Mario Nascimbene
Italian anthology films
Italian black-and-white films
1950s Italian films